The Prochaetodermatidae are a family of small worm-shaped (<1 cm) chaetoderm molluscs.  The burrowing organisms lack a true foot; they have a large pair of jaws and a small radula, comprising a dozen rows of paired teeth.  They are known from around the globe, except in polar regions, and inhabit ocean depts of 50 m to the deepest depths trawled.

References

Aplacophorans
Mollusc families